This is a list of suffixed state highways in the U.S. state of Arkansas. The spurs are named after their parent highways, which leads to multiple designations of the same name in some cases. All highways are maintained by the Arkansas Department of Transportation (ARDOT).

Shields

Arkansas state highway suffixed routes are signed using standard state highway shield backgrounds. The number remains the same size and a letter is added in an almost-exponential format. Shield sizes remain, one-digit routes keep the  shields, while two-digit routes become . Three-digit routes are the same as the parent route with the letter placed in the available corner space. Banners such as "alternate" are usually not used by the ARDOT, which instead prefers to use only a direction banner.

Suffixed state highways

See also

References

 
 
 
 

State suffixed